Colias harfordii, the Harford's sulphur, is a butterfly in the family Pieridae. It is found from the southern California coastal ranges and canyons from Kern County south to San Diego County. The habitat consists of open chaparral and woodland clearings.

The upper surface of the male is rich yellow, with the wing bases not darkened. The cell spot in the front wing is medium-sized and black, often with a white center. The forewing border is wide and the hindwing border is narrower. The cell spot in the hindwing is not noticeable. Females resembles males but the border is less well-defined, in some cases even reduced or lacking. Adults are on wing from February to May and again from June to August in two generations per year. Adults feed on flower nectar of thistles and mints.

The larvae feed on the leaves of Astragalus douglasii. The species overwinters in the larval stage.

References

harfordii
Butterflies described in 1877
Butterflies of North America